At the Jazz Corner of the World is a critically-acclaimed two-volume live album by American jazz drummer Art Blakey and The Jazz Messengers, released in 1959 on the Blue Note label. The album was originally issued on 12-inch LPs in two volumes (BLP 4015 and 4016) and later re-released as a two-CD double album.

Recorded on April 15, 1959 at the legendary New York jazz club Birdland, the performance features four songs that had also been recorded in-studio just five weeks earlier for Just Coolin’, an album that was subsequently shelved in favor of releasing At the Jazz Corner of the World. Just Coolin’ remained unreleased until July 2020, when it was put out by Blue Note as part of an extended celebration of Blakey’s Centennial.

Reception
The Allmusic review by Michael G. Nastos awarded the album 4.5 out of 5 stars, stating: "this band was as definitive a modern jazz ensemble as there ever was, and the immaculately chosen repertoire elevates this to one of the greatest live jazz sessions ever, and belongs on the shelf of all serious jazz listeners."

Track listing
Volume 1
 "Hipsippy Blues" (Hank Mobley) - 9:26
 "Justice" (Thelonious Monk) - 7:37
 "The Theme" (Traditional) - 2:18
 "Close Your Eyes" (Bernice Petkere) - 10:58
 "Just Coolin'" (Mobley) - 8:11
Volume 2
 "Chicken an' Dumplins" (Ray Bryant) - 7:26
 "M & M" (Mobley) - 6:41
 "Hi-Fly" (Randy Weston) - 8:00
 "The Theme" (Traditional) - 9:13
 "Art's Revelation" (Gildo Mahones) - 8:13

Recorded at Birdland in New York City on April 15, 1959

Personnel
Art Blakey – drums
Lee Morgan - trumpet
Hank Mobley - tenor saxophone
Bobby Timmons – piano
Jymie Merritt – bass
Pee Wee Marquette - announcer

References

Blue Note Records live albums
Art Blakey live albums
The Jazz Messengers live albums
1959 live albums
Albums produced by Alfred Lion